Johann August Ludwig Preiss (21 November 1811 – 21 May 1883) was a German-born British botanist and zoologist.

Early life
Preiss was born in Herzberg am Harz. He obtained a doctorate, probably at Hamburg, then emigrated to Western Australia.

Australia
Preiss was one of a number of influential German-speaking residents  such as William Blandowski, Ludwig Becker, Hermann Beckler, Amalie Dietrich, Diedrich Henne, Gerard Krefft, Johann Luehmann, Johann Menge, Carl Ludwig Christian Rümker (a.k.a. Ruemker), Moritz Richard Schomburgk, Richard Wolfgang Semon, George Ulrich, Eugene von Guérard, Robert von Lendenfeld, Ferdinand von Mueller, Georg von Neumayer, and Carl Wilhelmi  who brought their "epistemic traditions" to Australia, and not only became "deeply entangled with the Australian colonial project", but also "intricately involved in imagining, knowing and shaping colonial Australia" (Barrett, et al., 2018, p.2).

He arrived at the Swan River Colony on board the Britmart on 4 December 1838, remaining there until January 1842; during this time he became a British subject.

Specimens
During his time in Western Australia, Preiss collected about 200,000 plant specimens, containing from 3,000 to 4,000 species. His collections, together with those of James Drummond, formed the basis for early study of Western Australian flora. In 1842, he left Western Australia for London, where he broke up and sold his plant collection to recoup his costs. Various botanists published species based on his specimens, and these were later collated by Johann Lehmann to form the multi-volume Plantae Preissianae Sive Enumeratio Plantarum Quas in Australasia Occidentali et Meridionale Occidentali Annis 1838-41 Collegit L, published in Hamburg between 1844 and 1848.

The specimens collected by Preiss were not limited to plants: they included birds, reptiles, insects and molluscs. The molluscs were described by Karl Theodor Menke and published in Hanover in 1843 titled Molluscorum Novae Hollandiae Specimen.  In October 1839, Preiss tried to sell his collection of bird skins to the colonial government in Perth, but it was declined. Preiss's collection of animals was sold in parts throughout Europe to museums and collectors. The only distinguishable collection of any note, still extant, is in the Municipal Museum of Halberstadt.
The collection of bird skins, representatives of 181 species, was also distributed to various museums; one set that was viewed in 1937 at Hamburg's Zoölogical Museum was lost when the building was destroyed in the subsequent bombing campaigns at the city.

The first specimen of the Western Swamp Tortoise was collected by Preiss in 1839 and sent to the Vienna Museum where it was labelled New Holland, but was not named Pseudemydura umbrina until 1901 by Seibenrock. No further collections of the species were recorded until 1953.

Germany
Preiss returned to Herzberg am Harz in 1844 and settled there. He died there on 21 May 1883. It had been on his recommendation that Ferdinand von Mueller moved to Australia in 1847.

Commemorated
Preiss is commemorated in the names of about 100 species of flora in Western Australia, including plants in the genera Acacia, Allocasuarina, Eucalyptus, Grevillea, Hakea, Kunzea, Melaleuca, Santalum, Xanthorrhoea and Callitris.

Footnotes

References
 Barrett, L., Eckstein, L., Hurley, A.W. & Schwarz A. (2018), "Remembering German-Australian Colonial Entanglement: An Introduction", Postcolonial Studies, Vol.21, No.1, (January 2018), pp.1-5. 
 Calaby, J.H. (1967) Preiss, Johann August Ludwig (1811–1883) Australian Dictionary of Biography accessed 2 February 2007

1811 births
1883 deaths
People from Herzberg am Harz
Botanists active in Australia
Botanical collectors active in Australia
Botany in Western Australia
19th-century Australian zoologists
19th-century German botanists
Settlers of Western Australia